The Osa Peninsula is a peninsula located in southwestern Costa Rica, in the Puntarenas Province, with the Pacific Ocean to the west and the Golfo Dulce to the east. The peninsula was formed geologically by a faulting system that extends north into California.

The peninsula is home to at least half of all species living in Costa Rica. The main town on the peninsula is Puerto Jimenez, which has its own airport and provides access to Corcovado National Park as well as the coastal villages of Cabo Matapalo and Carate.
A large part of the peninsula is a wildlife/forest preserve that is protected: the Osa Conservation Area.

See also
 Coronado Bay, northwest of Osa Peninsula
 Drake Bay, located on the north side of the peninsula
 Golfito
 Osa Wildlife Sanctuary

References

External links

Peninsulas of Costa Rica
Geography of Puntarenas Province